Port of Tanjung Priok is the busiest and most advanced Indonesian seaport, handling more than 50% of Indonesia's trans-shipment cargo traffic. The port is located at Tanjung Priok, North Jakarta, which is operated by Indonesian state owned PT Pelindo. The port loaded and unloaded 6.2 million, 6.92 million, and 7.8 million TEUs of cargo during 2016, 2017 and 2018 respectively, out of a total capacity of about 8 million TEUs. The container port ranked as 22nd busiest in the world by Lloyd's One Hundred Ports 2019.

History
The earliest record mentioning Jakarta as a coastal settlement and port can be traced to the Indianized kingdom of Tarumanagara as early as the fourth century. In AD 39, King Purnawarman established Sunda Pura as a new capital city for the kingdom, located at the northern coast of Java.
Purnawarman left seven memorial stones with inscriptions bearing his name spread across the area, including the present-day Banten and West Java provinces. The Tugu Inscription is considered the oldest of all of them.

After the power of Tarumanagara declined, all of its many territories, including Sunda Pura, became part of the Kingdom of Sunda. The harbour area was renamed Sunda Kelapa as written in a Hindu monk's lontar manuscripts, which are now located at the Bodleian Library of Oxford University in England, and travel records by Prince Bujangga Manik. 

By the 14th century, Sunda Kelapa became a major trading port for the kingdom. The first European fleet, four Portuguese ships from Malacca, arrived in 1513 when the Portuguese were looking for a route for spices, especially black pepper.

A new harbor was needed for Dutch East Indies to replace the Sunda Kelapa harbor to the west that was too small for the increased traffic resulting from the opening of the Suez Canal. Construction on the Port of Tanjung Priok began in 1877 along with Tanjung Priuk railway station and other supporting facilities. The construction of the new harbor was started by Governor General Johan Wilhelm van Lansberge (1875-1881). The new harbor was named Tandjong Priok. Several facilities were built to support the function of the new harbor, such as the Tanjung Priuk Station (1914).

The port is part of the Maritime Silk Road that runs from the Chinese coast via the Suez Canal to the Mediterranean, there to the Upper Adriatic region of Trieste with its rail connections to Central and Eastern Europe.

JICT
A container terminal of the port is known as Jakarta International Container Terminal (JICT), which is operated by the Hutchison Port Holdings and Pelindo is the largest container terminal in Indonesia and the country's national hub port. In April 2011, JICT received an Asian Freight and Supply Chain Award (AFSCA) as the best service quality and technology innovation of terminal with less than 4 million twenty-foot equivalent units handling capacity.

Port extension (New Priok Terminal)

The port was among the least efficient in all Southeast Asia, with turn-around times 6 times that of Singapore, and severely congested due to slow customs handling, as well as limited port capacity. In regard to the port capacity, two-phase "New Priok" extension project is currently ongoing, which is expected to be fully operational in 2023. When fully operational this New Priok Port (which is also known as Kalibaru Port) will increase annual capacity of Tanjung Priok more than triple. Annual capacity will increase from five million twenty-foot equivalent units (TEU) of containers to 18 million TEU and the port will be able to facilitate triple-E class container ships (with an 18,000 TEU capacity) in a 300 meters wide two-way sea lane.

The first phase of the project was completed in 2016, which has helped to improve the performance of the port. The dwelling time in the port, which was once seven days, was reduced to almost three days. With eight cranes that can move 30 containers per hour and berths that can dock ships with a draft of as much as 16 meters, the new terminal which is known as NPT 1, can accommodate container ships with capacity up to 15,000 TEUs. The terminal has a land area of 32 hectares and the length of the dock is 450 meters. A joint venture between state-run port operator Pelindo II and a Japan-Singapore consortium handled the project under PT New Priok Container Terminal 1 ( NPCT1 ).

Description

The Port of Tanjung Priok has 20 terminals: general cargo, multipurpose terminal, scraps terminal, passenger terminal, dry bulk terminal, liquid bulk terminal, oil terminal,  chemicals terminal and three container terminals, 76 berths, a quay length of 16,853 metres, a total storage area of 661,822 m2 and a storage capacity of 401,468 tonnes.

Marunda terminal
PT Karya Citra Nusantara (KCN) operates Marunda port, which is built to reduce burden of bulk handling of Tanjung Priok port terminals. Pier 1 of this port has been operating since 2018. Another two pier is under-construction. Once completed the port will be able to handle about 30 to 35 million tons of bulk per year from 50 ships. The port will have three pier/docks with total length of 5,350 meters and a supporting area spreading over 100-hectares of land.

See also

 List of Indonesian ports
 List of world's busiest container ports
 Ministry of Transportation, Indonesia
 Transport in Indonesia
Tanjung Priok
Sunda Kelapa

References

Government-owned companies of Indonesia
T
Port authorities in Indonesia
North Jakarta